Atashgah Castle is a castle in the city of Kashmar, and is one of the attractions of Kashmar. This castle was built by the Sasanian government and it was famous in ancient times.

Location 
The location of the castle is strategically interesting. This fort is one of the most prominent and superior ancient forts of Iran in terms of inaccessibility and resistance against invaders and easily competes with the fortifications of Babak Fort in Kaleybar and Alamut Castle in Alamut. This shows that the builders of the castle have carried out extensive field studies to locate it. In total, Atashgah Castle is built on a high rocky cliff and difficult to cross, three sides of which are high and dangerous precipices. Around this cliff, shortly after the precipices, the walls of other high cliffs have re-enclosed it in the form of impenetrable and inaccessible fortifications.

See also 
 Atashgah Manmade-Cave
 Sasanian Empire
 Adur Burzen-Mihr

References 

Buildings and structures in Razavi Khorasan Province
Buildings and structures in Kashmar
Castles in Iran
Ruined castles in Iran
Sasanian castles
Tourist attractions in Razavi Khorasan Province
Castles of the Nizari Ismaili state
Sasanian architecture